of Japan, was the second head of the Kachō-no-miya collateral branch of the Japanese imperial family.

Prince Kachō Hiroatsu was the son of Prince Kachō Hirotsune, and succeeded his father as head of the Kachō-no-miya house on 25 May 1876. Due to his very young age, he was officially adopted by Emperor Meiji. Of weak constitution, Prince Hiroatsu died on 15 February 1883 at age eight.

To prevent the Kachō-no-miya line from becoming extinct, Emperor Meiji assigned Prince Fushimi Hiroyasu to succeed to the title in 1883.

References

 Jansen, Marius B. (2000). The Making of Modern Japan. Cambridge: Harvard University Press. ;  OCLC 44090600
 Keene, Donald. (2002). Emperor of Japan: Meiji and His World, 1852-1912. New York: Columbia University Press. ; OCLC 46731178
 Lebra, Sugiyama Takie. (1995). Above the Clouds: Status Culture of the Modern Japanese Nobility. Berkeley: University of California Press. 

1875 births
1883 deaths
Kachō-no-miya
Japanese princes
Royalty and nobility who died as children
People from Tokyo